American Eclipse or Great American Eclipse may refer to:

 American Eclipse (book), the 2017 book about the 1878 solar eclipse by David Baron
 American Eclipse (racehorse), a 19th-century racehorse
 Solar eclipse of June 8, 1918, "Great American Eclipse", a total solar eclipse seen widely across the contiguous United States
 Solar eclipse of August 21, 2017, "Great American Eclipse", a total solar eclipse seen widely across the contiguous United States
Solar eclipse of October 14, 2023
 Solar eclipse of April 8, 2024, "Great North American Eclipse"

See also
 List of solar eclipses visible from the United States